Artyom Grigorievich Sheinin (born January 26, 1966, Moscow, RSFSR, USSR) is a Russian journalist and propagandist. He has been alleged to serve as a government. He worked as a TV presenter and as First Deputy Director of the Directorate of Social and Journalistic Programs of JSC Channel One. From August 2016 (with a break from January to April 2017) — he hosted Time Will Tell. Since 2008, he served as manager of the show with Vladimir Pozner as host.  From January 23 to July 20, 2017 he hosted talk show First Studio.

Career 
From 1984—1986 he served in the  military. He was a participant in the Soviet–Afghan War as a sergeant of 56th Guards Air Assault Brigade.

In 1993 graduated from MSU Faculty of History. In 1996 he worked as anthropologist in Sakhalin and Chukchi Peninsula.

In 2007–2010, took part in television voice-over for documentaries for Discovery and TV shows for 2x2.

In 2008 received the Gratitude of the President of the Russian Federation (April 23, 2008 a) — "for information support and active public activities for the development of civil society in the Russian Federation".

In 2016 become a host of Time Will Tell TV show.

Personal life 
He remarried after divorcing his first wife and has three children.

References 

1966 births
Living people
Russian propagandists
Russian television personalities
Russian individuals subject to European Union sanctions